Wray Common Mill is a grade II* listed tower mill at Reigate, Surrey, England which has been converted to residential use.

History

Wray Common Mill was built in 1824. The mill was worked by wind until 1895 when an accident resulted in a broken sail. The mill had a steam engine, later replaced by an oil engine, as auxiliary power.  The shutters were removed from the sails c.1900. The condition of the sails rapidly deteriorated and a new set was fitted in 1928 by Thomas Hunt, the Soham millwright. At this time all machinery except the Windshaft and Brake Wheel was removed.

Residential Use
Wray Common Mill was converted into residential accommodation in 1967. The mill fell into a state of disrepair in the late 1990s, and a new owner started restoration in 2004. It now features four bedrooms, a large kitchen, reception and a wine cellar. It was listed for sale in November 2008 for £995,000.

Restoration

The cap was removed on 26 August 2004. A new cap was constructed, the building stripped to a bare shell and defects made good, the old tar was stripped, and a new coat applied to the exterior of the tower. The new cap was craned onto the mill in 2005. An application for Listed Building permission to replace the sails was made in 2006. The sails were fitted in December 2007, the restoration of the mill's external appearance to more closely match the mill in its working days was done in consultation of Bonwick Milling Heritage Consultancy. In a break with tradition, a modern method of producing laminated timber beams was used in making the sails. As a result of the work, the mill was removed from the Buildings at Risk Register in 2006.

Description

Wray Common Mill is a five-storey brick tower mill with an ogee cap with a gallery. It has four double Patent sails carried on a cast iron windshaft. The cap is winded by a fantail. The cast iron Brake Wheel alone remains of the machinery, although it is known that the millstones were driven overdrift.

Millers

Joseph Coulstock 1824–1832
Edward LArmer c1850
Robert Budgen 1855–1857
Joseph Henry Cooke 1874
Mrs M Cooke 1895

References

Tower mills in the United Kingdom
Grinding mills in the United Kingdom
Windmills completed in 1824
Grade II* listed buildings in Surrey
Windmills in Surrey
Grade II* listed windmills
Reigate